Jerry Don Logan (born August 27, 1941) is a former American football player. He played as a safety for ten seasons in the National Football League (NFL). He was a part of the Baltimore Colts Super Bowl V winning team.

College career 
Logan played for West Texas A&M (then known as West Texas State) during his college football career. Logan played on both sides of the ball, playing as a halfback on offense and a safety on defense. Not only that, but he also kicked extra points after touchdowns. During his senior season in 1962, Logan led the NCAA in scoring with 110 points. Logan scored 13 touchdowns and kicked 32 extra points during the year. His performance led West Texas State to a 9-2 record and an appearance in the 1962 Sun Bowl against Ohio. In that game, Logan would score a touchdown and intercept a pass, going on to win the Sun Bowl MVP as West Texas State defeated Ohio by the score of 15-14.

NFL career 
Logan was selected in both the 1963 NFL Draft (by the Baltimore Colts in the 4th round) and the 1963 AFL Draft (by the Oakland Raiders in the 9th round). He chose to sign with the NFL, and by the end of his rookie season was the starting left safety for the Colts. In his second season, Logan intercepted six passes and was named 2nd team NFL All-Pro by UPI. In 1967, Logan returned a punt for a 43 yard touchdown against the Detroit Lions. In both 1965 and 1970, Logan returned 2 interceptions for touchdowns in each year and would be named to the Pro Bowl after each year, as well as the 1971 season.

Logan played in two Super Bowls with the Colts, and clinched the win in Super Bowl V by intercepting a Craig Morton pass on the final play of the game.  After the 1972 season, Logan was traded to the Los Angeles Rams, but retired before training camp the next season. For his career, Logan intercepted 34 passes, and had five interception returns for touchdowns, which remains a Colts franchise record to this day.

See also
 List of NCAA major college football yearly scoring leaders

References

1941 births
Living people
People from Graham, Texas
Players of American football from Texas
American football safeties
West Texas A&M Buffaloes football players
Baltimore Colts players
Western Conference Pro Bowl players
American Conference Pro Bowl players